EASTinternational is an open submission exhibition that was launched in 1991 and curated by Lynda Morris at Norwich Gallery at Norwich University of the Arts. Applications from over 1,000 contemporary artists are received each year with approximately 25-30 artists selected to exhibit. Many artists who are now recognised as important figures had one of their first major public showings at EAST including Martin Creed, Jeremy Deller, Matthew Higgs, Tomoko Takahashi, Zarina Bhimji, Lucy McKenzie and Runa Islam. Some of these have gone on to win, or be nominated for, the Turner Prize.

Selectors
Selectors for each EAST are invited by Lynda Morris (EAST curator) and the EAST steering committee to reflect emerging political, social and artistic trends.
1991 Alexander Moffat and Andrew Brighton
1992 Helen Chadwick and Marjorie Allthorpe-Guyton
1993 David Tremlett and Konrad Fischer
1994 Jan Dibbets and Rudi Fuchs
1995 Giuseppe Penone and Marian Goodman
1996 Richard Long and Roger Ackling
1997 Nicholas Logsdail and Tacita Dean
1998 Alan Charlton and Michel Durand-Dessert
1999 Peter Doig and Roy Arden
2000 Keith Piper (artist) and Sebastian Lopez
2001 Mary Kelly (artist) and Peter Wollen
2002 Lawrence Weiner and Jack Wendler
2003 Toby Webster and Eva Rothschild
2004 Neo Rauch and Gerd Harry Lybke
2005 Gustav Metzger
2006 Jeremy Deller and Dirk Snauwaert
2007 Matthew Higgs and Marc Camille Chaimowicz
2009 Raster Gallery and Art and Language

EAST award winners
An award of £5,000 is given to an artist chosen by the selectors to help develop their work.
1991 Alexander Guy
1992 Victoria Arney, Naomi Dines
1993 Kenny Hunter
1994 Stephanie Smith
1995 Mary Evans
1996 Jacqueline Mesmaeker
1997 Tomoko Takahashi
1998 Martin McGinn
1999 Lucy McKenzie
2000 Jananne Al-Ani, Hew Locke
2001 Zarina Bhimji
2002 Adam Blumberg, Clare Iles, Daniel Milohnic/Dirk Paschke, Hiraki Sawa, Jessica Jackson Hutchins
2003 Richard Hughes
2004 Justin Mortimer
2005 Award shared amongst all artists
2006 Jarrett Mitchell, Ruth Ewan
2007 Patricia Esquivias

References

External links
EASTinternational

Art exhibitions in the United Kingdom
Norwich University of the Arts
1991 establishments in the United Kingdom
Recurring events established in 1991
Annual events in the United Kingdom